The official state language of Moldova is Romanian which is the native language of 82.2% of the population; it is also spoken as a primary language by other ethnic minorities. Gagauz, Russian, and Ukrainian languages are granted official regional status in Gagauzia and/or Transnistria.

Official language

The 1989 state language law of the former Moldavian Soviet Socialist Republic declared that Moldovan, written in the Latin script, was the sole state language, intending it to serve as a primary means of communication among all citizens of the republic. The law speaks of a common Moldovan-Romanian linguistic identity. Until 1989 Moldova used the Cyrillic alphabet for writing a language that was, by that time, no different from standard Bucharest Romanian; in part of Moldova, the separatist  Pridnestrovian Moldavian Republic, the old script is still used in schools and on street signs. Even after shifting to the Latin alphabet, some Moldovan officials continue to insist that the designated "state language" is an east-Romance idiom somehow separate from Romanian.

In 1991, the Declaration of Independence of Moldova named the official language as Romanian.

At 9 September 1994, Academy of Sciences of Moldova confirms the reasoned scientific opinion of philologists from the Republic and abroad (approved by the decision of the Presidium of Academy of Science of Moldova of 9.09.94), according to which the correct name of the State language (official) of the Republic of Moldova is Romanian.

The 1994 Constitution of Moldova said that "the national language of the Republic of Moldova is Moldovan, and its writing is based on the Latin alphabet."

In December 2013, the Constitutional Court of Moldova ruled that the Declaration of Independence takes precedence over the Constitution, and the state language should be called "Romanian".

Most linguists consider literary Romanian and Moldovan to be identical, with the glottonym "Moldovan" used in certain political contexts. In 2003, the Communist government of Moldova adopted a political resolution on "National Political Conception," stating that one of its priorities was preservation of the Moldovan language. This was a continuation of Soviet-inflected political emphasis.

Since the Declaration of Independence in 1991, schools refer to this language as "Romanian" when teaching it or referring to it.

In the 2004 census, 2,564,542 people (75.8% of the population of the country) declared their native language as "Moldovan" or "Romanian"; 2,495,977 (73.8%) speak it as first language in daily use. Apart from being the first language of use for 94.5% of ethnic Moldovans and 97.6% of ethnic Romanians, the language is also spoken as primary by 5.8% of ethnic Russians, 7.7% of ethnic Ukrainians, 2.3% of ethnic Gagauz, 8.7% of ethnic Bulgarians, and 14.4% of other ethnic minorities.

The 2014 census reported an estimated 2,998,235 people (without Transnistria), out of which 2,804,801 were actually covered by the census. Among them, 2,068,068 or 73.7% declared themselves Moldovans and 192,800 or 6.9% Romanians.
 Some organisations like the Liberal party of Moldova have criticised the census results, claiming Romanians comprise 85% of the population and that census officials have pressured respondents to declare themselves Moldovans instead of Romanians and have purposefully failed to cover urban respondents who are more likely to declared themselves Romanians as opposed to Moldovans 

According to the 2014 census, 2,720,377 answered to the question on "language usually used for communication". 2,138,964 people or 78.63% of the inhabitants of Moldova (proper) have Moldovan/Romanian as first language, of which 1,486,570 (53%) declared it Moldovan and 652,394 (23.3%) declared it Romanian.

However, in Chișinău, the proportion of people who declared Romanian as opposed to Moldovan is larger - 43.3% vs 33%.

On March 2, 2023, the Moldovan parliament voted in the first reading to replace the phrase "Moldovan language" with "Romanian language" in all legislation of the country. The proposed law was introduced by a group of members of the "Action and Solidarity Party" fraction. Additionally, phrases such as "official language," "state language," and "mother tongue" will also be replaced. The authors of the proposal argue that this change is necessary to implement the constitutional considerations outlined in the decisions of the Constitutional Court, which declared that the state language of the Republic of Moldova is Romanian. The bill also proposes that the National Holiday "Our Language," as it is currently referred to, be renamed "Romanian Language." The proposal passed its first reading with 56 votes in favor.

Official minority languages

Russian
Russian is one of the minority languages recognized in Moldova, and since Soviet times remains widely used on many levels of the society and the state. A policy document adopted in 2003 by the Moldovan parliament considers that "for Moldova, Moldovan-Russian bilingualism is characteristic". On 21 January 2021 the Constitutional Court declared a law passed by parliament that would have made Russian the "language for communication between ethnic communities" unconstitutional.

Russian was granted official status in Gagauzia, a region in the south of the country inhabited mostly by ethnic Gagauz, and in the breakaway region of Transnistria in the east of the country.

263,523 people, or 9.4% of the population, declared Russian as native language, and some 394,133 people, or 14.1% of the population, identified Russian as language of daily use. It is the first language for 93.2% of ethnic Russians, and a primary language for 4.9% of Moldovans, 50.0% of Ukrainians, 27.4% of Gagauz, 35.4% of Bulgarians, and 54.1% of other ethnic minorities.

Gagauz
Gagauz is an official minority language in Gagauzia, and has significant regional speaker population. A total of 114,532 people or 4.1% of the population identified Gagauz as their native language, but only 74,167 or 2.6% speak it as a first language.

Ukrainian
Ukrainian has co-official status in localities with significant Ukrainian population, and in the breakaway region of Transnistria. In the main part of the country, 186,394 people declared it native, and (of these) 107,252 or 3.8% speak it as a first language.

Foreign languages

While since the 1990s most Moldovans learn English as their first foreign language in schools, few speak it at a sufficiently advanced level to be able to communicate and understand it freely. Sometimes French, Italian, or Spanish are taught first. These languages are often used by Moldovan expats and working migrants in other countries, including France, Italy, Ireland, Spain, and the United Kingdom. Usually the migrants learn the new languages after arriving in a new country. The expatriates and working migrants in Portugal, Greece, Turkey, Cyprus, and Germany have learned those countries' respective languages. Speakers of Portuguese, Greek, Turkish, and German live in Moldova.

Moldovans of older and middle generations are generally bilingual in the Romanian language and Russian, due to the long influence of and trade with the Soviet Union. Many Moldovan expatriates and migrant workers live and work in Russia. Many of the younger generation in Moldova, however, may not know this language well enough to be able to communicate in writing or to have a sophisticated conversation. Children study Russian one hour per week in school. There are more TV channels available to watch in Russian than in Romanian.

See also
2004 Moldovan census
2014 Moldovan census
Culture of Moldova

References